Rachel Kramer Bussel (born 1975) is an author, columnist, and editor, specializing in erotica. She previously studied at the New York University School of Law and earned her bachelor's degree in political science and women's studies from the University of California, Berkeley.

Career
Bussel has been a Senior Editor at Penthouse Variations, a Contributing Editor to Penthouse, and a blogger for The Huffington Post. In addition, she is a rotating interviewer for the Gothamist and a columnist for SexIs Magazine. She has written for the Village Voice.

She has authored many erotic short stories and has collected her own works, as well as others', in dozens of published collections, including specialized volumes on BDSM (two volumes of Naughty Spanking Stories from A to Z and the He's On Top & She's On Top collections) and lesbian erotica (Glamour Girls & First-Timers). She has also co-edited a number of collections with other editors and writers, including Alison Tyler, Stacy Bias, Wendy Caster, Julie May, and Christopher Pierce.

From 2005 to 2010, she was the curator for a monthly erotic reading series, In the Flesh, in New York City.

Personal life
She identifies as bisexual, saying in 2006, "I think ideally I'd like to have a male lover and a female lover, either a triad situation or one on one."

Kramer has been a resident of Teaneck, New Jersey.

Awards
She received a 2009 Independent Publisher Book Award for the Tasting Him and Tasting Her anthologies. She received the National Leather Association International’s Samois Anthology Award for 2012 for Surrender: Erotic Tales of Female Pleasure and Submission, for 2016 for Dirty Dates: Erotic Fantasies For Couples, and for 2019 for The Big Book Of Submission Volume 2.

Bibliography

As author

 The Lesbian Sex Book: A Guide for Women Who Love Women with Wendy Caster (2003)
 The Art of the Erotic Love Letter  (2011)
 Everything But  (2011)

As editor

 Naughty Spanking Stories from A to Z (2004)
 Up All Night: Adventures in Lesbian Sex with Stacy Bias (2004)
 First-timers: True Stories of Lesbian Awakening (2006)
 Caught Looking: Erotic Tales of Voyeurs and Exhibitionists (2006)
 Secret Slaves: Erotic Stories of Bondage with Christopher Pierce (2006)
 Ultimate Undies: Erotic Stories About Underwear and Lingerie with Christopher Pierce (2006)
 Sexiest Soles: Erotic Stories About Feet And Shoes with Christopher Pierce (2006)
 Second Skin: Erotic Stories About Leather and Latex with Christopher Pierce (2006)
 Glamour Girls: Femme/Femme Erotica (2006)
 Naughty Spanking Stories from A to Z, Volume 2(2006)
 Crossdressing: Erotic Stories (2007)
 Hide and Seek: Erotic Stories with Alison Tyler (2007)
 Sex and Candy: Twenty Succulent Stories (2007)
 He's on Top: Erotic Stories of Male Dominance and Female Submission (2007)
 She's on Top: Erotic Stories of Female Dominance and Male Submission (2007)
 Best Sex Writing 2008 (2007)
 Yes, Ma'am: Erotic Stories of Female Dominance (2008)
 Yes, Sir: Erotic Stories of Male Dominance (2008)
 Dirty Girls: Erotica for Women (2008)
 Rubber Sex: Erotic Stories (2008)
 Spanked: Red Cheeked Erotica (2008)
 Tasting Her: Oral Sex Stories (2008)
 Tasting Him: Oral Sex Stories (2008)
 The Lust Chronicles Anthology (2008)
 Bedding Down (2008) 
 Best Sex Writing 2009 (2008)
 Love Notes: A Music and Sex Anthology (2009)
 Do Not Disturb: Hotel Sex Stories (2009)
 Mile High Club: Plane Sex Stories (2009)
 Bottoms Up: Spanking Good Stories (2009)
 Peep Show: Erotic Tales of Voyeurs and Exhibitionists (2009)
 Best Sex Writing 2010 (2009)
 Please, Sir: Erotic Stories of Female Submission (2010)
 Please, Ma'am: Erotic Stories of Male Submission (2010)
 Fast Girls: Erotica for Women (2010)
 Orgasmic: Erotica for Women (2010)
 Smooth: Erotic Stories for Women (2010)
 Passion: Erotic Romance for Women (2010)
 Best Bondage Erotica 2011 (2010)
 Surrender: Erotic Tales of Female Pleasure and Submission (2011)
 Gotta Have It: 69 Stories of Sudden Sex (2011)
 Obsessed: Erotic Romance for Women (2011)
 Women in Lust: Erotic Stories (2011)
 Best Bondage Erotica 2012 (2011)
 Best Sex Writing 2012: The State of Today's Sexual Culture (2012)
 Irresistible: Erotic Romance for Couples (2012)
 Curvy Girls: Erotica for Women (2012)
 Going Down: Oral Sex Stories (2012)
 Anything for You: Erotica for Kinky Couples (2012)
 Hungry for More: Romantic Fantasies For Women (2012)
 Cheeky Spanking Stories (2012)
 Instruments of Pleasure: Sex Toy Erotica (2012)
 Best Bondage Erotica 2013 (2012)
 Only You: Erotic Romance for Women (2013)
 Best Sex Writing 2013: The State of Today's Sexual Culture (2013)
 Twice the Pleasure: Bisexual Women's Erotica (2013)
 Serving Him: Sexy Stories of Submission (2013)
 Baby Got Back: Anal Erotica (2013)
 Big Book of Orgasms: 69 Sexy Stories (2013)
 Best Bondage Erotica 2014 (2014)
 Big Book of Submission: 69 Kinky Tales (2014)
 Best Bondage Erotica 2015 (2015)
 Naked Desire: Erotic Romance for Women (2015)
 I Want You Bad: Obsessed Erotic Romance for Women (2015)
 Dirty Dates: Erotic Fantasies for Couples (2015)
 Come Again: Sex Toy Erotica (2015)
 Best Women's Erotica of the Year, Volume 1 (2016)
 Begging For It: Erotic Fantasies for Women (2016)
 Best Women's Erotica of the Year, Volume 2 (2016)
 On Fire: Erotic Romance Stories (2017)
 Best Women's Erotica of the Year, Volume 3 (2017)
 The Big Book of Submission, Volume 2: 69 Kinky Tales (2017)
 Candy Lovers: Sugar Erotica (2018)
 Best Women's Erotica of the Year, Volume 4 (2018)
 Erotic Teasers (2019)
 Best Women's Erotica of the Year, Volume 5 (2019)
 Best Bondage Erotica of the Year, Volume 1 (2020)
 Best Women's Erotica of the Year, Volume 6 (2020)
 Best Bondage Erotica of the Year, Volume 2 (2021)
 Coming Soon: Women's Orgasm Erotica (2021)
 Best Women's Erotica of the Year, Volume 7 (2021)
 Big Book of Orgasms, Volume 2: 69 Sexy Stories (2022)

References

External links

 
 Rachel Kramer Bussel at Elle magazine
 
 "An Erotica Writer on Why So Many Women Are Into Kink"
 "Erotica author is boring in the bedroom — and she likes it that way"

1975 births
Living people
UC Berkeley College of Letters and Science alumni
American women short story writers
21st-century American short story writers
BDSM writers
Bisexual women
Place of birth missing (living people)
New York University School of Law alumni
American erotica writers
Women erotica writers
People from Teaneck, New Jersey
Sex-positive feminists
21st-century American women writers
Educators from New Jersey
American women educators
American bisexual writers